In linguistics, a word stem is a part of a word responsible for its lexical meaning. The term is used with slightly different meanings depending on the morphology of the language in question. In Athabaskan linguistics, for example, a verb stem is a root that cannot appear on its own and that carries the tone of the word. Athabaskan verbs typically have two stems in this analysis, each preceded by prefixes.

In most cases, a word stem is not modified during its declension, while in some languages it can be modified (apophony) according to certain morphological rules or peculiarities, such as sandhi. For example in Polish:  ("city"), but  ("in the city"). In English: "sing", "sang", "sung".

Uncovering and analyzing cognation between word stems and roots within and across languages has allowed comparative philology and comparative linguistics to determine the history of languages and language families.

Usage
In one usage, a word stem is a form to which affixes can be attached. Thus, in this usage, the English word friendships contains the word stem friend, to which the derivational suffix -ship is attached to form a new stem friendship, to which the inflectional suffix -s is attached. In a variant of this usage, the root of the word (in the example, friend) is not counted as a stem (in the example, the variant contains the stem friendship, where -s is attached).

In a slightly different usage, which is adopted in the remainder of this article, a word has a single stem, namely the part of the word that is common to all its inflected variants. Thus, in this usage, all derivational affixes are part of the stem. For example, the stem of friendships is friendship, to which the inflectional suffix -s is attached.

Word stems may be a root, e.g. run, or they may be morphologically complex, as in compound words (e.g. the compound nouns meatball or bottleneck) or words with derivational morphemes (e.g. the derived verbs black-en or standard-ize). Hence, the stem of the complex English noun photographer is photo·graph·er, but not photo. For another example, the root of the English verb form destabilized is stabil-, a form of stable that does not occur alone; the stem is de·stabil·ize, which includes the derivational affixes de- and -ize, but not the inflectional past tense suffix -(e)d. That is, a stem is that part of a word that inflectional affixes attach to.

For example, the stem of the verb wait is wait: it is the part that is common to all its inflected variants.
wait (infinitive)
wait (imperative)
waits (present, 3rd people, singular)
wait (present, other persons and/or plural)
waited (simple past)
waited (past participle)
waiting (progressive)

Citation forms and bound morphemes 

In languages with very little inflection, such as English and Chinese, the stem is usually not distinct from the "normal" form of the word (the lemma, citation or dictionary form). However, in other languages, word stems may rarely or never occur on their own. For example, the English verb stem run is indistinguishable from its present tense form (except in the third person singular). However, the equivalent Spanish verb stem corr- never appears as such because it is cited with the infinitive inflection (correr) and always appears in actual speech as a non-finite (infinitive or participle) or conjugated form. Such morphemes that cannot occur on their own in this way are usually referred to as bound morphemes.

In computational linguistics, the term "stem" is used for the part of the word that never changes, even morphologically, when inflected, and a lemma is the base form of the word. For example, given the word "produced", its lemma (linguistics) is "produce", but the stem is "produc" because of the inflected form "producing".

Paradigms and suppletion 
A list of all the inflected forms of a word stem is called its inflectional paradigm. The paradigm of the adjective tall is given below, and the stem of this adjective is tall.
tall (positive); taller (comparative); tallest (superlative)
Some paradigms do not make use of the same stem throughout; this phenomenon is called suppletion. An example of a suppletive paradigm is the paradigm for the adjective good: its stem changes from good to the bound morpheme bet-.
good (positive); better (comparative); best (superlative)

Oblique stem 
Both in Latin and in Greek, the declension (inflection) of some nouns uses a different stem in the oblique cases than in the nominative and vocative singular cases. Such words belong to, respectively, the so-called third declension of the Latin grammar and the so-called third declension of the Ancient Greek grammar. For example, the genitive singular is formed by adding -is (Latin) or -ος (Greek) to the oblique stem, and the genitive singular is conventionally listed in Greek and Latin dictionaries to illustrate the oblique.

Examples

English words derived from Latin or Greek often involve the oblique stem: adipose, altitudinal, android, mathematics.

Historically, the difference in stems arose due to sound change in the nominative. In the Latin third declension, for example, the nominative singular suffix -s combined with a stem-final consonant. If that consonant was c, the result was x (a mere orthographic change), while if it was g, the -s caused it to devoice, again resulting in x. If the stem-final consonant was another alveolar consonant (t, d, r), it elided before the -s. In a later era, n before the nominative ending was also lost, producing pairs like atlas, atlant- (for English Atlas, Atlantic).

See also 
 Lemma (morphology)
 Lexeme
 Morphological typology
 Morphology (linguistics)
 Principal parts
 Root (linguistics)
 Stemming algorithms (computer science)
 Thematic vowel

References 

 What is a stem? - SIL International, Glossary of Linguistic Terms.
 Bauer, Laurie (2003) Introducing Linguistic Morphology. Georgetown University Press; 2nd edition.
 Williams, Edwin and Anna-Maria DiScullio (1987) On the definition of a word. Cambridge MA, MIT Press.

External links 

 Searchable reference for word stems including affixes (prefixes and suffixes)

Units of linguistic morphology
Linguistics terminology

eo:Radiko#Lingvo